The Missouri Pacific Railroad , commonly abbreviated as MoPac, was one of the first railroads in the United States west of the Mississippi River. MoPac was a Class I railroad growing from dozens of predecessors and mergers. In 1967, the railroad operated 9,041 miles of road and 13,318 miles of track, not including DK&S, NO&LC, T&P, and its subsidiaries C&EI and Missouri-Illinois.

Union Pacific Corporation, the parent company of the Union Pacific Railroad, agreed to buy the Missouri Pacific Railroad on January 8, 1980. Lawsuits filed by competing railroads delayed approval of the merger until September 13, 1982. After the Supreme Court denied a trial to the Southern Pacific, the merger took effect on December 22, 1982. However, due to outstanding bonds of the Missouri Pacific, its full merger into the Union Pacific Railroad did not become official until January 1, 1997.

History 
On July 4, 1851, ground was broken at St. Louis on the Pacific Railroad, the predecessor of the Missouri Pacific Railroad. The first section of track was completed in 1852; in 1865, it was the first railroad in Kansas City, after construction was interrupted by the American Civil War. In 1872, the Pacific Railroad was reorganized as the Missouri Pacific Railway by new investors after a railroad debt crisis.  Because of corporate ties extending back to the Pacific Railroad, Missouri Pacific at one time advertised itself as being "The First Railroad West of the Mississippi".

Other predecessors included the St. Louis, Iron Mountain and Southern Railway (SLIMS), Texas and Pacific Railway (TP), Chicago and Eastern Illinois Railroad (C&EI), St. Louis, Brownsville and Mexico Railway (SLBM), Kansas, Oklahoma and Gulf Railway (KO&G), Midland Valley Railroad (MV), San Antonio, Uvalde and Gulf Railroad (SAU&G), Gulf Coast Lines (GC), International-Great Northern Railroad (IGN), Kansas, Nebraska & Dakota Railroad, New Orleans, Texas and Mexico Railway (NOTM), Missouri-Illinois Railroad (MI), as well as the small Central Branch Railway (an early predecessor of MP in Kansas and south-central Nebraska), and joint ventures such as the Alton and Southern Railroad (AS).

Missouri Pacific was under the control of New York financier Jay Gould from 1879 until his death in 1892. Gould developed a system extending through Colorado, Nebraska, Arkansas, Texas, and Louisiana. His son George Gould inherited control upon his father's death, but lost control of the company after it declared bankruptcy in 1915. The line was merged with the St. Louis, Iron Mountain and Southern Railway (SLIMS) and reorganized as the Missouri Pacific Railroad in 1917. Missouri Pacific later acquired or gained a controlling interest in other lines in Texas, including the Gulf Coast Lines, International-Great Northern Railroad, and the Texas and Pacific Railway.

MoPac declared bankruptcy again in 1933, during the Great Depression, and entered into trusteeship. The company was reorganized and the trusteeship ended in 1956.

By the 1980s, the system would own 11,469 miles of rail line over 11 states bounded by Chicago to the east, Pueblo, Colorado, in the west, north to Omaha, south to the U.S.-Mexico border in Laredo, Texas, and southeast along the Gulf seaports of Louisiana and Texas. MoPac operated a fleet of more than 1,500 diesel locomotives, almost all purchased within the previous 10 years. Under the leadership of Downing B. Jenks, who became president and chief executive in 1961, the company became a pioneer in the early days of computer-guided rail technology. It was a major hauler of coal, grain, ore, autos, dry goods and shipping containers. At the time of its mega-merger in 1982, the MoPac owned more and newer locomotives and operated more track than partner Union Pacific Railroad.

On December 22, 1982, the Missouri Pacific was purchased by the Union Pacific Corporation and combined with the Western Pacific Railroad and Union Pacific Railroad to form one large railroad system. The new entity was called Pacific Rail Systems; though part of the Union Pacific Corporation, all three railroads maintained their own corporate and commercial identity. On December 1, 1989, the Missouri Kansas Texas and the Galveston, Houston & Henderson were merged into the Missouri Pacific after having been acquired by the Union Pacific Corporation in 1988.

By 1994, all motive power of the Missouri Pacific was repainted and on January 1, 1997, the Missouri Pacific was officially merged into the Union Pacific Railroad by the Union Pacific Corporation. UP continued to use the MoPac headquarters building at 210 N. 13th St. in downtown St. Louis for its customer service center until February 15, 2005. The former MoPac building has undergone rehab as apartments and is now known as Park Pacific.

In this table, "MP" includes New Orleans Texas & Mexico and all its subsidiary railroads (Beaumont Sour Lake & Western, I-GN, StLB&M, etc.) that officially merged into MP in 1956. Ton-miles for C&EI in 1970 presumably don't include the L&N portion.

By that same definition, MP operated 10,431 route-miles at the end of 1929, after A&G, SAS and Sugar Land had come under NOT&M; NO&LC operated 60 and DK&S (not subsidiary until 1931) operated 6. At the end of 1960, MP operated 9,362 route-miles, NO&LC and DK&S were the same, and M-I operated 172 miles.

"T&P" includes its subsidiary roads (A&S, D&PS, T-NM etc.); operated route-miles totaled 2,259 at the end of 1929 (after C≠, PVS and TSL had become subsidiaries) and 2,033 at the end of 1960.

Passenger train service 

In the early years of the 20th century, most Missouri Pacific and St. Louis, Iron Mountain and Southern passenger trains were designated by number only, with little emphasis on premier name trains.  This changed in May, 1915, with the inauguration of the Scenic Limited between St. Louis, Kansas City, and San Francisco.  Between Pueblo, Colorado and Salt Lake City, the Scenic Limited operated through the Royal Gorge over the tracks of the Denver and Rio Grande Railroad.  From Salt Lake City to San Francisco, the Scenic Limited operated over the Western Pacific Railroad.  A second premier train, the Sunshine Special began operating on December 5, 1915, between St. Louis and San Antonio via Little Rock and Austin.  Another named train, the Rainbow Special, was placed in service in July 1921 between Kansas City and Little Rock.  The Sunshine Special soon eclipsed the other trains in travel volume, becoming the signature train of the Missouri Pacific Railroad.  An advertising slogan in 1933 proclaimed: "It's 70-degrees in the Sunshine when it's 100-degrees in the shade," referring to the fact that the Sunshine Special was one of the first air-conditioned trains in the southwest.  When new streamlined trains were delivered, the Scenic Limited and Rainbow Special names faded, but the Sunshine Special had sufficient name recognition to co-exist along with the new streamliners into the late 1950s.

In the streamliner era, the Missouri Pacific's premier passenger trains were collectively known as the Eagles.  A variety of Eagle trains were operated, with the first such train inaugurated in 1940.  These routes included the Missouri River Eagle (St. Louis-Kansas City-Omaha), the Delta Eagle (Memphis, Tennessee-Tallulah, Louisiana), the Colorado Eagle (St. Louis-Pueblo-Denver), the Texas Eagle (St. Louis to Texas), and the Valley Eagle (Houston-Corpus Christi-Brownsville, Texas).

Other notable MoPac trains operated included:

the Houstonian (between New Orleans and Houston);
Missourian (between St. Louis and Kansas City);
Orleanean (between Houston and New Orleans);
Ozarker (between St. Louis and Little Rock);
Pioneer (between Houston and Brownsville);
Southerner (service from Kansas City and St. Louis to New Orleans, via Little Rock);
Southern Scenic (between Kansas City and Memphis);
Sunflower (between St. Louis and Wichita); and
the Texan (between St. Louis and Fort Worth).

Missouri Pacific gained a reputation for aggressively discontinuing passenger trains after the mid-1960s. When the National Railroad Passenger Corporation (Amtrak) assumed passenger train operations on May 1, 1971, the only Missouri Pacific route included as part of Amtrak's basic system was its main line from St. Louis to Kansas City. This route is now served by Amtrak's Missouri River Runner (named for the fact that it runs mostly parallel to the Missouri River).  On March 13, 1974, Amtrak restored passenger train service over segments of Missouri Pacific-Texas and Pacific's original Texas Eagle route between St. Louis, Little Rock, Dallas, Austin, San Antonio, and Laredo with the Inter-American. This train was renamed the Texas Eagle in 1981, resurrecting the name of the famous MoPac train. The Amtrak version runs over former MoPac and T&P trackage for much of its route.

Honorary tribute 
On July 30, 2005, UP unveiled a brand new EMD SD70ACe locomotive, Union Pacific 1982, with Missouri Pacific paint and logos, as part of a new heritage program.

References 

 Trainweb/Screaming Eagles. "About Missouri Pacific: A Brief Overview." Accessed 2009-12-18.
Goen, Steve Allen (1997). Texas & Pacific Color Pictorial, Four Ways West Publications, La Mirada, CA. 
Stout, Greg (1995). Route of the Eagles, Missouri Pacific in the Streamlined Era, White River Productions, Bucklin, MO.

Further reading

External links 

Screaming Eagles
Missouri Pacific Historical Society
Sunshine Special
Union Pacific Diesel Locomotive Paint Schemes
Brief history of the Missouri Pacific
Handbook of Texas: Missouri Pacific System
 Oklahoma Digital Maps: Digital Collections of Oklahoma and Indian Territory

 
Companies based in St. Louis
Predecessors of the Union Pacific Railroad
Former Class I railroads in the United States
Defunct Arkansas railroads
Defunct Colorado railroads
Defunct Illinois railroads
Defunct Kansas railroads
Defunct Louisiana railroads
Defunct Mississippi railroads
Defunct Missouri railroads
Defunct Nebraska railroads
Defunct New Mexico railroads
Defunct Oklahoma railroads
Defunct Tennessee railroads
Defunct Texas railroads
Railroads in the Chicago metropolitan area
Standard gauge railways in the United States
Railway companies established in 1872
Railway companies disestablished in 1982
Former components in the Dow Jones Transportation Average